Cortinarius walkeri is a basidiomycete fungus of the genus Cortinarius native to Australia. It was first described by Mordecai Cubitt Cooke & George Edward Massee in 1893 from a specimen, MEL 0220681A, collected by Anna Frances Walker in the Blue Mountains, and named in her honour.

See also
List of Cortinarius species

References

External links
Cortinarius walkeri occurrence data (Atlas of Living Australia)

walkeri
Fungi of Australia
Fungi described in 1893
Taxa named by Mordecai Cubitt Cooke